Maha Sona or Maha Sohona (Sinhala: මහ සෝනා, මහ සොහොනා) is a yaka (or yakseya or devaya, meaning demon)  in Sinhalese folklore, who is said to haunt afterlife. The name Maha Sona means " the greatest  demon" or "god or demon of the cemetery" in the Sinhala language. It is the most feared god or demon in Sri Lanka. Originally a giant who had been defeated and decapitated in a duel by another giant named Gotaimbara (lived in the 1st century BC), Maha Sonaa has had his head replaced with that of a bear or tiger. He is believed to kill people by crushing their shoulders and also by afflicting illnesses. Traditional exorcism rituals are performed to repel the demon in such cases. Sri Lanka Army's Long Range Reconnaissance Patrol units are popularly known as the "Maha Sohon Brigade", named after this demon.

Origins
In local folk traditions Maha Sona is formerly a human known as Ritigala Jayasena (Jayasena of Ritigala), a fierce warrior living around the reign of King Dutugamunu. After offending Gotaimbara (one of the Ten Giant Warriors of King Dutugamunu) in a drunken stupor, they agree to a bare-hands dual. Depending on the version of the tale, Gotaimbara decapitates Jayasena either accidentally or by a single kick, where the cadaver is removed to an open graveyard. Seeing the predicament of Jayasena, a deity takes pity and tries to revive him before the cadaver goes cold (or another time limit is reached). Since there is very little time remaining, the deity finds a bear head in a hurry and fits it before reviving him. In the chaos of trying to locate Jayasena's head within the time limit, the deity fits the head backwards. Following Jayasena's revival and seeing the grotesque form, people who come across him are terrified to the point of falling ill. Either because he was found or encountered in a large graveyard, the new persona is dubbed 'Maha Sohona or Maha Sohon Yaka (Great Demon of the Graveyard)' by people according to the popular origin versions. It is also worth noting, the term 'sohon' (සොහොන්) in Sinhala not only means grave or cemetery, but can also mean 'foul' in general. Therefore, 'Maha Sohona' can also mean 'The Great Fell'.

However, folk songs around the country also provide alternative origins to Maha Sona without linking him to the person Jayasena. Depending on the folk songs he may be called a demon or a deity. Maha Sona remains probably the deepest etched supernatural being in the Sri Lankan psyche, unsurpassed by the terror the name invokes.

Characteristics
Maha Sona is believed to haunt graveyards, looking for human prey. He also haunts large rocks and hills, surrounded by human corpses. Junctions where three roads meet are other haunting grounds of this demon, and he is able to spread cholera and dysentery. Maha Sohona is chief to 30,000 demons, and often uses various disguises, each time riding a particular animal such as a goat, deer, horse, sheep and elephant.

He has the head of a bear or tiger, rides a pig and drinks the blood of a buffalo he carries in his right hand. He is also armed with a pike in his left hand.

Maha Sona kills people at night by striking them between the shoulders. The mark of a hand will be embossed on the flesh of the body after this. Apart from killing, he is also able to possess humans.

Exorcism 
In traditional exorcism rituals, dancers dressed as Maha Sona perform to cure patients of illnesses that are believed to have been afflicted by the demon. A traditional mask depicting the face of Maha Sona is used in these rituals. Also, it is believed that when he comes to the earth in the form of a man no one can stop him.

In Galle District Sri Lanka Mahasona and other demons (yakshas) such as Riri Yaka were benevolent, though they caused illness in the victims, resulting in healing rituals. Exorcists are of a particular caste, the Berawayas, of whom the majority perished in the  Boxing Day Tsunami. The exorcist does not refer to Mahasona as evil, but jokes with him, plays cards and eats meat usually throughout the night, till the patient is well the next morning. Professor Bruce Kapferer has written extensively on this in his book 'A Celebration of Demons: Exorcism and the Aesthetics of Healing in Sri Lanka'. Bloomington: Indiana University Press, 2nd edition, 1983.

See also
 Sacca-kiriyā
 Paritta
 Reeri Yakseya

References

Demons of Sri Lanka